Heavenly Creatures is a 1994 New Zealand biographical psychological drama film directed by Peter Jackson, from a screenplay he co-wrote with his partner, Fran Walsh, and starring Kate Winslet and Melanie Lynskey in their feature film debuts, with supporting roles by Sarah Peirse, Diana Kent, Clive Merrison, and Simon O'Connor. Based on the notorious 1954 Parker–Hulme murder case in Christchurch, the film focuses on the relationship between two teenage girls—Pauline Parker and Juliet Hulme—which culminates in the murder of Parker's mother. The events of the film span the period from their meeting in 1952 to the murder in 1954.

The film opened in 1994 at the 51st Venice International Film Festival, where it won the Silver Lion and became one of the best-received films of the year. Reviewers praised most aspects of the production, with particular attention given to the performances by the previously unknown Winslet and Lynskey, as well as for Jackson's directing. The film received an Oscar nomination for Best Original Screenplay.

Plot
In 1952 Christchurch, an affluent 13-year-old English girl Juliet Hulme befriends a 14-year-old girl from a working-class family, Pauline Parker, when Juliet transfers to Pauline's school. They bond over a shared history of severe childhood disease and isolating hospitalizations, and over time develop an intense friendship. Pauline admires Juliet's outspoken arrogance and beauty.

Together they paint, write stories, make plasticine figurines, and eventually create a fantasy kingdom called Borovnia. It is the setting of the adventure novels they write together, which they hope to have published and eventually made into films in Hollywood. Over time it begins to be as real to them as the real world.

Pauline's relationship with her mother Honora becomes increasingly hostile and the two fight constantly. This angry atmosphere is in contrast to the peaceful intellectual life Juliet shares with her family. Pauline spends most of her time at the Hulmes', where she feels accepted. Juliet introduces Pauline to the idea of "the Fourth World", a Heaven without Christians where music and art are celebrated. Juliet believes she will go there when she dies. Certain actors and musicians have the status of saints in this afterlife, such as singer Mario Lanza, with whom both girls are obsessed.

During a day trip to Port Levy, Juliet's parents announce that they are going away and plan to leave Juliet behind. Her fear of being left alone makes her hysterical, culminating in her first direct experience of the Fourth World, perceiving it as a land where all is beautiful and she is safe. She asks Pauline to come with her, and the world that Juliet sees also becomes visible to Pauline. This is presented as a shared spiritual vision, a confirmation of their "Fourth World" belief, that influences the girls' predominant reality and affects their perception of events in the everyday world.

Juliet is diagnosed with tuberculosis and is sent to a clinic. Pauline is desolate without her, and the two begin an intense correspondence, writing not only as themselves, but in the roles of the royal couple of Borovnia. During this time Pauline begins a sexual relationship with a lodger, which makes Juliet jealous. For both of them, their fantasy life becomes a useful escape when under stress in the real world, and the two engage in increasingly violent, even murderous, fantasies about people who oppress them. After four months, Juliet is released from the clinic and their relationship intensifies. Juliet's father blames the intensity of the relationship on Pauline and speaks to her parents, who take her to a doctor. The doctor suspects that Pauline is homosexual and considers this a cause of her increasing anger at her mother as well as her dramatic weight loss.

Juliet catches her mother having an affair with one of her psychiatric clients and threatens to tell her father, but her mother tells her he already knows. Shortly afterward, the two announce their intention to divorce, upsetting Juliet. Soon it is decided that the family will leave Christchurch, with Juliet to be left with a relative in South Africa. She becomes increasingly hysterical at the thought of leaving Pauline, and the two girls plan to run away together. When that plan becomes impossible, the two share a bathtub and talk about murdering Pauline's mother as they see her as the primary obstacle to their being together.

As the date of Juliet's departure nears, it is decided that the two girls should spend the last three weeks together at Juliet's house. At the end of that time, Pauline returns home and the two finalize plans for the murder. Honora plans a trip for the three of them to Victoria Park, and the girls decide this will be the day. Juliet conceals a broken piece of brick in her bag and Pauline places it into an old stocking before departing on the trip. After having tea, the three walk on a path down a steep hillside. When Honora bends over to pick up a pink charm the girls have deliberately dropped, Juliet and Pauline bludgeon her to death with the brick.

A post-script states that Pauline and Juliet were arrested shortly after the murder; that, as the girls were too young to face the death penalty, both were sentenced to serve five years in prison; that they were released separately in 1959; and that it was a condition that they never see one another again.

Cast

 Kate Winslet as Juliet Hulme
 Melanie Lynskey as Pauline Parker
 Sarah Peirse as Honora Parker
 Diana Kent as Hilda Hulme
 Clive Merrison as Dr. Henry Hulme
 Simon O'Connor as Herbert Rieper
 Jed Brophy as John
 Peter Elliott as Bill Perry
 Gilbert Goldie as Dr. Bennett
 Elizabeth Moody as Miss Waller

Production

Development
Fran Walsh suggested to Peter Jackson (who was noted for horror-comedy films) that they write a film about the notorious Parker-Hulme murder. Jackson took the idea to his long-time collaborator, producer Jim Booth (who died after filming). The three filmmakers decided that the film should tell the story of the friendship between the two girls rather than focus on the murder and trial. "The friendship was for the most part a rich and rewarding one, and we tried to honour that in the film. It was our intention to make a film about a friendship that went terribly wrong," said Peter Jackson.

Walsh had been interested in the case since her early childhood. "I first came across it in the late sixties when I was ten years old. The Sunday Times devoted two whole pages to the story with an accompanying illustration of the two girls. I was struck by the description of the dark and mysterious friendship that existed between them—by the uniqueness of the world the two girls had created for themselves."

Jackson and Walsh researched the story by reading contemporary newspaper accounts of the trial. They decided that the sensational aspects of the case that so titillated newspaper readers in 1954 were far removed from the story that Jackson and Walsh wished to tell. "In the 1950s, Pauline Parker and Juliet Hulme were branded as possibly the most evil people on earth. What they had done seemed without rational explanation, and people could only assume that there was something terribly wrong with their minds," states Jackson. To bring a more humane version of events to the screen, the filmmakers undertook a nationwide search for people who had close involvement with Pauline Parker and Juliet Hulme forty years earlier. This included tracing and interviewing seventeen of their former classmates and teachers from Christchurch Girls' High School. In addition, Jackson and Walsh spoke with neighbours, family friends, colleagues, policemen, lawyers and psychologists. Jackson and Walsh also read Pauline's diary, in which she made daily entries documenting her friendship with Juliet Hulme and events throughout their relationship. From the diary entries, it became apparent that Pauline and Juliet were intelligent, imaginative, outcast young women who possessed a wicked and somewhat irreverent sense of humor. In the film, all of Pauline's voice-overs are excerpts from her journal entries.

Casting
The role of Pauline was cast after Walsh scouted schools all over New Zealand to find a Pauline 'look-alike'. She had trouble finding an actress who resembled Pauline and had acting talent before discovering Melanie Lynskey. Kate Winslet was among 175 girls to audition for the film, and was cast after impressing Jackson with the intensity she brought to her part. The girls were both so absorbed by their roles that they kept on acting as Pauline and Juliet after the filming was done, as is described on Jackson's website.

Principal photography
The entire film was shot on location in Christchurch in 1993. Jackson has been quoted as saying "Heavenly Creatures is based on a true story, and as such I felt it important to shoot the movie on locations where the actual events took place."

Post-production
The visual effects in the film were handled by the then newly created Weta Digital. The girls' fantasy life, and the "Borovnian" extras (the characters the girls made up) were supervised by Richard Taylor while the digital effects were supervised by George Port. Taylor and his team constructed over 70 full-sized latex costumes to represent the "Borovnian" crowds—plasticine figures that inhabit Pauline and Juliet's magical fantasy world. Heavenly Creatures contains over thirty shots that were digitally manipulated ranging from the morphing garden of the "Fourth World," to castles in fields, to the sequences with "Orson Welles" (played by Jean Guérin).

Music 
 "Just a Closer Walk with Thee" – Choirs of Burnside High School, Cashmere High School, Hagley Community College, Villa Maria College
 "Be My Love" – written by Nicholas Brodszky, Sammy Cahn; performed by Mario Lanza
 "The Donkey Serenade" – performed by Mario Lanza
 "(How Much Is) That Doggie in the Window?" – Bob Merrill; performed by the actors
 "Funiculì, Funiculà" – written by Luigi Denza, Peppino Turco; performed by Mario Lanza
 "E lucevan le stelle" from Tosca by Giacomo Puccini; performed by Peter Dvorský
 "The Loveliest Night of the Year" – performed by Mario Lanza
 "Sono Andati" from La Bohème by Giacomo Puccini; performed by Kate Winslet
 "The Humming Chorus" from Madama Butterfly by Giacomo Puccini – performed by the Hungarian State Opera
 "You'll Never Walk Alone" – performed by Mario Lanza

Reception

Critical response 
Heavenly Creatures garnered wide critical praise. Review aggregator Rotten Tomatoes gives the film a 93% score based on 56 reviews, with an average rating of 8.10/10. The site's critical consensus reads, "Dark, stylish, and captivating, Heavenly Creatures signals both the auspicious debut of Kate Winslet and the arrival of Peter Jackson as more than just a cult director." On Metacritic, the film has a score of 86 out of 100 based on reviews from 31 critics, indicating "universal acclaim".

Nick Hyman, writing for Metacritic, thought that 1994's Oscar-winning Forrest Gump was equally matched by "Memorable Film(s) Not Nominated for Best Picture", including Heavenly Creatures, of which Hyman said, "Peter Jackson's masterful blend of fantastical visions and a heartbreaking real-life murder tragedy has arguably never been topped."

Owen Gleiberman, writing for Entertainment Weekly, gave the film a B+ and said, "Set in the early '50s, in the New Zealand village of Christchurch, this ripe hallucination of a movie – a rhapsody in purple – has been photographed in sun-drenched candy color that lends it the surreal clarity of a dream... There's something bracing about the way that Heavenly Creatures serves up its heroines' fantasies with literal-minded brute force." Gleiberman complains that Jackson never quite explains "why the two girls have metamorphosed into the '50s teenybop answer to Leopold and Loeb," yet concludes, "Still, if the pleasures of Heavenly Creatures remain defiantly on the surface, on that level the movie is a dazzler."

Box office

Heavenly Creatures had a limited box office success, but performed admirably in various countries, including the United States, where it grossed a total of $3,049,135 during its limited run in 57 theatres; it grossed $5,438,120 worldwide. In the US, it opened on two screens in New York City (Angelika Film Center and Lincoln Plaza) and had the biggest per-screen gross of the weekend with an average gross of $15,796, grossing $41,323 in its opening 5 days.

Accolades 
Heavenly Creatures was an Academy Award nominee in 1994 for Best Original Screenplay and won for Best British Actress at the 1st Empire Awards. It featured in a number of international film festivals, and received very favourable reviews worldwide.

Miramax International believed that reception at the Cannes Film Festival would make the film more appealing than it already was.

The film made top ten of the year lists in Time, The Guardian, The Sydney Morning Herald, and The New Zealand Herald. It appears in Schneider's book 1001 Movies You Must See Before You Die.

The film also did exceptionally well at the 1995 New Zealand film and television awards.

Year-end lists 
 3rd – Kevin Thomas, Los Angeles Times
 5th – Kenneth Turan, Los Angeles Times
 5th – Yardena Arar, Los Angeles Daily News
 9th – Desson Howe, The Washington Post
 9th –  Glenn Lovell, San Jose Mercury News
 Top 10 (listed alphabetically, not ranked) – Matt Zoller Seitz, Dallas Observer
 Top 10 (listed alphabetically, not ranked) – Eleanor Ringel, The Atlanta Journal-Constitution
 Top 10 (listed alphabetically, not ranked) – Steve Murray, The Atlanta Journal-Constitution
 Top 10 (listed alphabetically, not ranked) – Bob Ross, The Tampa Tribune
 Top 10 (not ranked) – Betsy Pickle, Knoxville News-Sentinel
 Honorable mention – Michael Mills, The Palm Beach Post
 Honorable mention – Michael MacCambridge, Austin American-Statesman
 Honorable mention – Jeff Simon, The Buffalo News

Awards

Home media 

In 1996, the film was released on videocassette and on Laserdisc at its original runtime of 99 minutes. In 2002, the film received DVD releases in Region 1 and Region 4 in an "uncut version" which ran for 109 minutes. Region 2 released the original 99-minute theatrical version.

See also
 "Lisa the Drama Queen", an episode of The Simpsons loosely based on the film.
 Don't Deliver Us from Evil, another film loosely based on the Parker–Hulme case.

References

Further reading
 Elleray, Michelle. "Heavenly Creatures in Godzone" in: Out Takes: Essays on Queer Theory and Film. Edited by Ellis Hanson. Duke University Press, 1999. pp. 223+. .

External links

 
 
 
 
 Heavenly Creatures at NZ On Screen
 heavenly-creatures.com fanwebsite with an impressive amount of information on both the movie and the Parker-Hulme_murder_case.

1994 films
1990s New Zealand films
1990s biographical drama films
1990s female buddy films
1990s coming-of-age drama films
1994 crime drama films
1994 independent films
1994 LGBT-related films
1990s psychological drama films
1990s buddy drama films
Christchurch
Cultural depictions of Orson Welles
Drama films based on actual events
1990s English-language films
Films about murderers
Films directed by Peter Jackson
Films set in 1952
Films set in 1953
Films set in 1954
Films set in New Zealand
Films shot in New Zealand
LGBT-related buddy drama films
LGBT-related coming-of-age films
LGBT-related films based on actual events
Matricide in fiction
Teen crime films
New Zealand biographical drama films
New Zealand coming-of-age drama films
New Zealand independent films
New Zealand LGBT-related films
Films with screenplays by Fran Walsh
Films with screenplays by Peter Jackson
Crime films based on actual events
WingNut Films films
Miramax films
Biographical films about writers
Films produced by Peter Jackson